Bartholomeu Gugani (28 January 1899 – 17 April 1935), known as Barthô, was a Brazilian footballer. He played in five matches for the Brazil national football team in 1922. He was also part of Brazil's squad for the 1922 South American Championship.

References

External links
 

1899 births
1935 deaths
Brazilian footballers
Brazil international footballers
Footballers from São Paulo
Association football defenders
São Paulo FC players